Tell Abu Hawam is the site of a small city established in the Late Bronze Age (14th century BCE) in the area of modern-day Haifa, Israel. The sixth century BCE geographer Scylax described the city as being located "between the bay and the promontory of Zeus", by the latter meaning the northwestern extremity of Mount Carmel. It existed as a port city and a fishing village, and was moved to the site south of what is now the neighborhood of Bat Galim. The city eventually expanded into what is now the city of Haifa.

References
 Encyclopedia Judaica, Haifa, Keter Publishing, Jerusalem, 1972, vol. 7, pp. 1134–1139
 The New Encyclopedia of Archaeological Excavations in the Holy Land, Volume 5, article Abu Hawam  p 1553

Archaeological sites in Israel
History of Haifa